Long Division may refer to:

 Long division, a standard arithmetic procedure for dividing simple or complex multidigit numbers
 Long Division (Low album), 1995
 Long Division (Rustic Overtones album), 1995
 "Long Division", a song by Death Cab for Cutie from the 2008 album Narrow Stairs
 Long Division, a 2013 novel by Kiese Laymon